LSU refers to Louisiana State University, a public university in Baton Rouge, Louisiana, United States.

LSU may also refer to:

Education
La Sainte Union College of Higher Education, teacher training college in Southampton, United Kingdom
La Salle University (Ozamiz), a Lasallian university in the Philippines
La Sierra University, a Seventh-day Adventist university in Riverside, California, United States
Lambda Sigma Upsilon, a Latino collegiate fraternity
Leyte State University, a public university in Baybay, Leyte, Philippines
Lithuanian Sports University, a university in Kaunas, Lithuania
Liverpool Students' Union, the students' union for Liverpool John Moores University, United Kingdom
Loughborough Students' Union, the students' union for Loughborough, Leicestershire, United Kingdom
LSU Tigers and Lady Tigers, Louisiana State University's athletic program
Lupane State University, Zimbabwe

Other uses
 LSU rRNA, large subunit ribosomal ribonucleic acid
 Latin-Script Uyghur, also known as the Uyghur Latin alphabet
 Lifesavers Underground, a Christian rock band
 Link state update, a type of OSPF protocol message
 Livestock Unit, a measure of livestock density
 Long Sukang Airport by IATA code
 Load-store unit, a specialized execution unit